William Henry Quilliam (10 April 1856 – 23 April 1932), who changed his name to Abdullah Quilliam and later Henri Marcel Leon or Haroun Mustapha Leon, was a 19th-century convert from Christianity to Islam, noted for founding England's first mosque and Islamic centre.

Early life
William Henry Quilliam was born at 22 Eliot Street, Liverpool, on 10 April 1856, to a wealthy local family. He spent most of his childhood on the Isle of Man and was brought up as a Methodist. He was educated at the Liverpool Institute and the Manx King William's College.

He became a solicitor in 1878, specialising in criminal law, and practising at 28 Church Street, Liverpool. He defended suspects in many high-profile murder cases.  In 1879, he married Hannah Johnstone. At this time, Quilliam was a Wesleyan Methodist and a proponent of the temperance movement.

Conversion to Islam

Quilliam converted to Islam in 1887 after visiting Morocco to recover from an illness. Quilliam purchased numbers 8, 11 and 12 Brougham Terrace, Liverpool, following his conversion, thanks to a donation from Nasrullah Khan, Crown Prince of the Emirate of Afghanistan. 8 Brougham Terrace became the Liverpool Muslim Institute, the first functioning mosque in Britain; it opened on Christmas Day, 1889. Quilliam also opened a boarding school for boys and a day school for girls, as well as an orphanage, Medina House, for non-Muslim parents who were unable to look after their children and agreed for them to be brought up as Muslims. In addition, the Institute hosted educational classes covering a wide range of subjects, and included a museum and science laboratory. 
In 1889, he first published The Faith of Islam, which was concerned with dawah to Islam and its key principles. Initially, 2000 copies were published, but a further 3000 copies were produced in 1890. Quilliam also published The Crescent, a weekly account of Muslims in Britain, and Islamic World, a monthly publication with a worldwide audience. 

In 1890, Quilliam orchestrated protests against the showing of Hall Caine's play, Mahomet. The first public Muslim burial in Liverpool was of Michael Hall, a former Methodist preacher who had converted to Islam, in 1891.

A number of notables converted to Islam as a result of Quilliam's preaching. They included professors Nasrullah Warren and Haschem Wilde, as well as Robert Stanley, JP and former mayor of Stalybridge. It is estimated that around 600 people converted to Islam in Britain as a direct result of Quilliam's work.

He travelled extensively and received many honours from the leaders of the Islamic world. Abdul Hamid II, the 26th Ottoman Caliph, granted Quilliam the title of Shaykh al-Islām for the British Isles. The Emir of Afghanistan recognised him as the Sheikh of Muslims in Britain and he was appointed as Persian Vice Consul in Liverpool by the Shah. He had contact with English-speaking West African Muslims and toured the region's coastal cities on his way to Lagos to attend the consecration of the Shitta Bey Mosque in 1894.

Quilliam's work in Liverpool stopped when he left England in 1908 in advance of being struck off the Roll of Solicitors for unprofessional conduct as a solicitor. His son swiftly disposed of the property that had been used as a mosque and Islamic centre. Without Quilliam's influence and funding, the Muslim community in Liverpool dispersed.

He returned to the UK before December 1914 under the name of H. M. Leon. He spent much of his time at Onchan on the Isle of Man. He died in Taviton Street, Bloomsbury, London in 1932, and was buried in an unmarked grave
at Brookwood Cemetery near Woking. The prominent Anglo-Muslims Abdullah Yusuf Ali, Muhammad Marmaduke Pickthall (who each translated the Qur'an), and Lord Headley were later buried near him.

Political views
Quilliam argued that Muslims should not "take up arms" against other Muslims on the behalf of non-Muslims. During the war in Sudan, Quilliam published a pamphlet stating that any British Muslim that decided to aid in some manner the expedition was acting in "contrary to the Shariat". His political views and  allegiance to the Ottoman Caliph led some to denounce him as a traitor.

Legacy
His legacy is principally maintained by the Abdullah Quilliam Society, which was founded in 1996. The society aims to complete the restoration of the Liverpool Muslim Institute on Brougham Terrace. The society has been assisted by academics including Ron Geaves, formerly of Liverpool Hope University, and Mehmet Seker of Dokuz Eylül University. The society also offers university student accommodation.

Quilliam, originally The Quilliam Foundation, a think tank aimed at challenging extremist Islamist ideologies, launched in 2008, was named after him.

See also

 Alexander Russell Webb, early prominent Anglo-American Muslim convert
 Islam in the United Kingdom

Notes and references

Sources
 
  (Includes poems by Quilliam and others)

External links
 Abdullah Quilliam Society
 Abdullah Quilliam: The History of British Muslims
 Quilliam Foundation
 Forgotten champion of Islam: One man and his mosque The Independent newspaper, 2 August 2007
 Special BBC feature on Abdullah Quilliam and his Mosque, including audio testimonials from his grand-daughter and admirers
 The Muslim Council of Britain's  biography and profile on Quilliam's life
 The Riddle of Life, poem by Abdullah Quilliam
 Quilliam mentioned in early Ahmadiyya sources and his connection with the Woking Muslim Mission under the name Professor H. M. Leon
 A brief look at Muslims in Britain from yesteryear

1856 births
1932 deaths

Converts to Islam from Protestantism
English religious writers
English former Christians
19th-century Muslim scholars of Islam
Burials at Brookwood Cemetery
English people of Manx descent
Clergy from Liverpool
People educated at King William's College
People educated at Liverpool Institute High School for Boys
English Muslims
English solicitors